The John Rowe House in Jasper, Minnesota, United States, is described as a "common bungalow type (built ca. 1905) expressed in uncommon material—locally quarried Sioux quartzite."  The house is listed on the National Register of Historic Places. John Rowe, a quarry man, clad the house in local Sioux quartzite after purchasing the home in 1903 for $1,000. The home has been well maintained and is a privately owned residence, not open to the public.

See also
National Register of Historic Places listings in Pipestone County, Minnesota

References

Houses in Pipestone County, Minnesota
Houses on the National Register of Historic Places in Minnesota
National Register of Historic Places in Pipestone County, Minnesota
Stone houses in the United States
Bungalow architecture in Minnesota